Nizhneyablochny is a rural locality (a khutor) and the administrative center of Nizhneyablochnoye Rural Settlement, Kotelnikovsky District, Volgograd Oblast, Russia. The population was 1,174 as of 2010. There are 12 streets.

Geography 
Nizhneyablochny is located in steppe, on the bank of the Tsimlyansk Reservoir, 37 km north of Kotelnikovo (the district's administrative centre) by road. Krasnoyarsky is the nearest rural locality.

References 

Rural localities in Kotelnikovsky District